The Clinical Laboratory Improvement Amendments (CLIA) of 1988 are United States federal regulatory standards that apply to all clinical laboratory testing performed on humans in the United States, except clinical trials and basic research.

CLIA Program
In accord with the CLIA, the CLIA Program sets standards and issues certificates for clinical laboratory testing. CLIA defines a clinical laboratory as any facility which performs laboratory testing on specimens derived from humans for the purpose of providing information for:
 diagnosis, prevention, or treatment of disease or impairment
 health assessments
An objective of the CLIA is to ensure the accuracy, reliability and timeliness of test results regardless of where the test was performed. Most Laboratory Developed Tests have been regulated under this program. In 2014 the FDA started a public discussion about regulating some LDTs.

Per CLIA, each specific laboratory system, assay, examination is graded for level of complexity by assigning scores of 1, 2, or 3 for each of the following seven criteria. A score of 1 is the lowest level of complexity, and a score of 3 indicates the highest level. Score 2 is assigned when the characteristics for a particular test are intermediate between the descriptions listed for scores of 1 and 3.

Criteria for categorization:
 Knowledge
 Training and experience
 Reagents and materials preparation
 Characteristics of operational steps
 Calibration, quality control, and proficiency testing materials
 Test system troubleshooting and equipment maintenance
 Interpretation and judgment
Centers for Medicare and Medicaid Services (CMS) has the primary responsibility for the operation of the CLIA Program. Within CMS, the program is implemented by the Center for Medicaid and State Operations, Survey and Certification Group, and the Division of Laboratory Services.

The CLIA Program is funded by user fees collected from approximately 200,000 laboratories, most located in the United States.

CLIA-waived tests
Under CLIA, tests and test systems that meet risk, error, and complexity requirements are issued a CLIA certificate of waiver. In November 2007, the CLIA waiver provisions were revised by the United States Congress to make it clear that tests approved by the FDA for home use automatically qualify for CLIA waiver, although many waived tests are not done according to designed protocols – more than 50% of such tests are done incorrectly – and result in medical errors, some with fatal consequences.

Minimum periods of retention
CLIA and the College of American Pathologists (CAP) have written policies for the minimum period of that laboratories should keep laboratory records and materials, with some examples as follows:

See also
Medical technologist

References

Health standards
Standards of the United States
Healthcare in the United States
Medicare and Medicaid (United States)
Organizations established in 1988